Cirque du Chaser was a stage production, produced by Laughing Stock Productions, and written and performed by the Australian comedian team The Chaser in 2005.

In March 2005 as part of the Sydney Big Laugh Comedy Festival, The Chaser team launched an 85-minute stage show named Cirque du Chaser (the name is a parody of Cirque du Soleil) to sellout audiences. It was originally intended to have seven shows, but due to popular demand an eighth show was added at short notice. The show contained similar material to the Chaser's TV shows including political satire and humorous commentary on topical events.

Cirque du Chaser also appeared at the Adelaide Cabaret Festival in June 2005.

Due to the success of these shows, The Chaser team took Cirque du Chaser on a national tour (produced by Laughing Stock Productions), visiting Brisbane, Melbourne, Sydney, Newcastle, Wollongong and Canberra during September and October 2005.

See also

References

External links
Chaser Official Website

The Chaser